Gaëtan Hart (born November 9, 1953) is a former lightweight/welterweight boxer from Canada, who was a three-time boxing champion for his country. He lost his only world title fight against Aaron Pryor in 1980. Boxer Cleveland Denny died 16 days after being knocked out by Hart in 1980. Six weeks prior to that bout, Hart defeated Ralph Racine and put him in a coma from which Racine eventually recovered.

In 1992, he was featured in a National Film Board of Canada documentary, The Steak (a title inspired by Jack London's short story A Piece of Steak), directed by Pierre Falardeau. Hart now runs a Gatineau (Hull, Quebec) boxing club.

An article on Hart appeared in the April 1979 The Ring magazine.

References

External links

1953 births
Living people
Canadian male boxers
Sportspeople from Gatineau
Lightweight boxers
Welterweight boxers